Robin Hemley, born in New York City, is an American nonfiction and fiction writer. He is the author of fifteen books, and has had work published in The New York Times, New York Magazine, Creative Nonfiction, Brevity, Conjunctions, The Sun, and Narrative, among others. In 2020, he joined the faculty of Long Island University, where his is Director and Polk Professor in Residence of the George Polk School of Communications.

Life and career
Robin Hemley was born to a Jewish family. His father, Cecil Hemley, was co-founder, with Arthur A. Cohen, of Noonday Press. His mother, Elaine Gottlieb Hemley, published fiction and poetry.

Hemley graduated from Indiana University Bloomington with a B.A. in comparative literature and from the University of Iowa with an MFA in Fiction. He earned a PhD in creative practice from the University of New South Wales in 2020.

His writing awards include three Pushcart Prizes in fiction and nonfiction, first place in the Nelson Algren Award for Fiction from The Chicago Tribune, and the Independent Press Book Award for Nonfiction.

At Western Washington University, he edited The Bellingham Review for five years and founded the Tobias Wolff Award for Fiction and the Annie Dillard Award for Nonfiction. In 2004, he began teaching at the University of Iowa where he was hired as the Director of the Nonfiction Writing Program, and since 2000 he has taught at Vermont College of Fine Arts, where he served as Faculty Chair for three years. At the University of Iowa, he founded the NonfictioNOW Conference in 2005.

From 2013 to 2019, he was the Director of the Writing Program, Writer-in-Residence, and Professor of Humanities at Yale-NUS College in Singapore.

He lives in Brooklyn, is married, and has four daughters.

Selected works

Fiction
The Mouse Town and Other Stories (Word Beat Press, 1987) 
All You Can Eat (Atlantic Monthly Press, 1988) 
The Last Studebaker, a novel (Graywolf Press, 1992) 
The Big Ear, stories (Blair, 1997) 
Reply All: Stories (Indiana University Press, 2012) 

Non-fiction
Nola: A Memoir of Faith, Art, and Madness (Graywolf Press, 1998) 
Invented Eden: The Elusive, Disputed History of the Tasaday (Bison Books, 2003) 
Extreme Fiction: Fabulists and Formalists, with Michael Martone (Pearson Education, 2003) 
Do-Over! In which a forty-eight-year-old father of three returns to kindergarten, summer camp, the prom, and other embarrassments (Little, Brown and Company, 2009) 
A Field Guide for Immersion Writing: Memoir, Journalism, and Travel (University of Georgia Press, 2012) 
I'll Tell You Mine: Thirty Years of Essays from the Iowa Nonfiction Writing Program, editor, with Hope Edelman (University of Chicago Press, 2015) 
Turning Life into Fiction (Chinese edition, Renmin University Press, 2018)
Borderline Citizen: Dispatches from the Outskirts of Nationhood (University of Nebraska Press, 2020) 
The Art and Craft of Asian Stories: A Writer’s Guide and Anthology, with Xu Xi (Bloomsbury Publishing, 2021) 

Short stories
"All Good Things are Surprises" (Narrative, 2007)

References

External links
 
 University of Iowa department bio
 Hemley's interview with Steve Paulson on To the Best of Our Knowledge on Wisconsin Public Radio

Year of birth missing (living people)
Living people
American male writers
Writers from New York City
Jewish American novelists
20th-century American novelists
Indiana University Bloomington alumni
Iowa Writers' Workshop alumni
University of North Carolina at Charlotte faculty
Western Washington University faculty
University of Iowa faculty
Vermont College of Fine Arts faculty
American memoirists
21st-century American Jews